Sparkling Fresh is a live performances album by free jazz ensemble Universal Congress Of, released on April 21, 1998 through Hazelwood Records.

Track listing

Personnel 

Universal Congress Of
Joe Baiza – guitar, vocals, production
Steve Gaeta – bass guitar
Paul Lines – drums
Steve Moss – tenor saxophone, vocals and harp on "Mud Man Blues"

Additional musicians and production
Christian Bornitz – production
Gordon Friedrich – production, engineering
Unkle Jan – engineering
Jan Schmelcher – illustrations

References 

1998 live albums
Universal Congress Of albums
Live free jazz albums